Edmund Hayes may refer to:

 Edmund Hayes (judge) (1804–1867), Irish judge
 Edmund B. Hayes (1849–1923), American engineer and businessman
 Sir Edmund Samuel Hayes (1806–1860), Member of Parliament for County Donegal
 Sir Edmund Francis Hayes, 5th Baronet (1850–1912)